, founded on 1 April 2004 as Sony Financial Holdings Inc., is a Japanese holding company for Sony's financial services business and headquartered in Tokyo, Japan. It operates various businesses, including both life and non-life insurances, online banking, credit card settlement, nursing care, and venture capital.

On May 19, 2020, Sony Corporation announced that it will turn Sony Financial Holdings, of which Sony already owns 65.06% of shares, to a wholly owned subsidiary through a tender offer. Sony Financial Holdings has been delisted from the Tokyo Stock Exchange after the takeover process was finalized on July 14, 2020.

Subsidiaries

 Sony Life Insurance
 Sony Assurance
 Sony Bank
 Sony Payment Services
 SmartLink Network
 Sony Lifecare
 Lifecare Design
 Proud Life
 Sony Financial Ventures

References

External links
Sony Financial Group Inc. 
Sony Life Insurance Co., Ltd. 
Sony Assurance Inc. 
Sony Bank Inc. 
Sony Lifecare Inc. 

Financial services companies established in 2004
Financial Group
Banks of Japan
Financial services companies based in Tokyo
Holding companies based in Tokyo
Companies formerly listed on the Tokyo Stock Exchange